Matias Lloci (born 22 April 2000) is a Belgian professional footballer who plays for Belgian First Division B club Virton. He plays on the right side of the pitch, primarily as a wide midfielder and full-back.

Club career
On 8 August 2022, Lloci signed with Virton.

Personal life 
Born in Belgium, Lloci is of Albanian descent.

References 

2000 births
Living people
Belgian footballers
Belgian people of Albanian descent
Association football midfielders
Association football fullbacks
S.V. Zulte Waregem players
K.A.A. Gent players
K.V.C. Westerlo players
Omonia Aradippou players
R.E. Virton players
Challenger Pro League players
Belgium youth international footballers
Belgian expatriate footballers
Expatriate footballers in Cyprus
Belgian expatriate sportspeople in Cyprus